Robert Rey may refer to:
 Robert Rey (ski jumper)
 Robert Rey (plastic surgeon)
 Robert Rey (art historian)